Kahak (also, Kahak-e Qom) is a city in and capital of Kahak County of Qom province, Qom Province, Iran. At the 2006 census, its population was 2,766, in 797 families.

References 

Qom County

Cities in Qom Province
Kahak District